The 1942–43 NHL season was the 26th season of the National Hockey League (NHL). The Brooklyn Americans were dropped, leaving six teams to play a schedule of 50 games. This is the first season of the "Original Six" era of the NHL. The league's long-time president Frank Calder died due to heart disease. The Detroit Red Wings defeated the Boston Bruins to win the Stanley Cup.

League business
The NHL and the Canadian Amateur Hockey Association (CAHA) agreed in principle that a junior-aged player could become a professional whenever he wanted, to make a living under wartime conditions. They expected that NHL clubs would rely on junior-aged players as replacements due to military enlistments. In October 1942, a new professional-amateur agreement was reached by NHL president Frank Calder, and CAHA president Frank Sargent. NHL teams were permitted to sign junior-aged players if the junior club was contacted first, and agreed not to sign any other junior-eligible players who had not yet played for the CAHA. The NHL continued to pay the CAHA for developing players.

The Brooklyn Americans franchise was dropped, as Madison Square Garden turned down a lease agreement with team owner Red Dutton. Dutton argued that the other teams would be weakened by the war, but the other owners pointed out the number of American players serving in the armed forces was such that the Americans could not operate. A despondent Dutton left the league meeting, but was to return to the NHL sooner than he thought.

With the suspension of the Americans, this was the inaugural season of the so-called Original Six era, with the NHL consisting of six teams (the Boston Bruins, Chicago Black Hawks, Detroit Red Wings, Montreal Canadiens, New York Rangers, and Toronto Maple Leafs). This arrangement would last until the 1966–67 season, after which the league doubled in size.

Death of Frank Calder
The league's meeting of January 25, 1943, was to have been a non-event. The only news that was supposed to come out of the meeting was that the playoffs would begin on March 20, and that all series would be best-of-seven affairs. This was resolved in the morning session.

The afternoon session had just begun and Calder had informed Red Dutton of the reserve status of his suspended franchise, when Toronto coach Hap Day noticed that Calder appeared to be in pain. Two league governors came up to his aid, but he assured them he was all right. Then Calder's face contracted as if he were in pain. He took a few steps and exclaimed "My God, there IS something wrong!" He was taken to his hotel room and a doctor diagnosed a heart attack. A specialist convinced him, despite his protests, to check into St. Michael's Hospital in Toronto, where he suffered a second heart attack. In a week, Calder felt well enough to return to Montreal and checked into Montreal General Hospital. After eating a light breakfast surrounded by his family and friends, he was looking over the league books when he slipped back on the pillows of his bed and died of a third heart attack. He died on February 4, 1943, at the age of 65 years. Red Dutton was chosen as the new president, on an "interim" basis.

Regular season
Due to war-time travel restrictions, the NHL ceased playing overtimes to decide tie games on November 21 partway through the season. The last regular season overtime game was November 10, 1942, between the Chicago Black Hawks and the New York Rangers, won by New York 5–3. Regular season overtime would not be re-introduced until the 1983–84 NHL season, with a slight change from playing out the entire overtime period, to a sudden death format.

Highlights
Detroit finished first, partly due to the six shutouts of goaltender Johnny Mowers, who won the Vezina Trophy. During the season, Jimmy Orlando got into a stick-swinging incident with Toronto rookie Gaye Stewart and came out of it on the short end, badly cut in the face and bleeding profusely. Both players were suspended for the incident.

The Montreal Canadiens were still making progress, and coach Dick Irvin put together the first "Punch Line" of Elmer Lach, Toe Blake and Joe Benoit. Maurice Richard showed promise, but broke his leg, and Canadiens' manager Tommy Gorman began to look at him as brittle. Benoit became the first Canadien to hit the 30 goal plateau since Howie Morenz did it in 1929–30 (40 goals) scoring an even 30. Gordie Drillon also added some scoring power. The Canadiens made the playoffs by one slim point and lost to Boston in the playoffs' first round.

In contrast to the 1941–42 season, the Rangers felt the full impact of World War II and lost Art Coulter, Alex Shibicky, the Colville brothers, and Bill Juzda to the Armed Forces. Only Ott Heller was left of their defence. Babe Pratt was traded to Toronto for Hank Goldup and Dudley "Red" Garrett. Garrett proved to be an excellent replacement for Pratt. However, he only played 21 games, then gave his life in the Armed Forces. Goaltending was the Rangers problem as Steve Buzinski, Jimmy Franks, and old veteran Bill Beveridge all had to face lots of rubber as the Rangers went from first to worst.

Final standings

Playoffs

Playoff bracket

Semifinals

(1) Detroit Red Wings vs. (3) Toronto Maple Leafs

(2) Boston Bruins vs. (4) Montreal Canadiens
This was the last time that Boston defeated Montreal in a postseason series until 1988.

Stanley Cup Finals

Awards

All-Star teams

Player statistics

Scoring leaders
Note: GP = Games played, G = Goals, A = Assists, PTS = Points, PIM = Penalties in minutes

Source: NHL

Leading goaltenders

Note: GP = Games played; Mins – Minutes played; GA = Goals against; GAA = Goals against average; W = Wins; L = Losses; T = Ties; SO = Shutouts

Coaches
Boston Bruins: Art Ross
Chicago Black Hawks: Paul Thompson
Detroit Red Wings: Jack Adams
Montreal Canadiens: Dick Irvin
New York Rangers: Frank Boucher
Toronto Maple Leafs: Hap Day

Debuts
The following is a list of players of note who played their first NHL game in 1942–43 (listed with their first team, asterisk(*) marks debut in playoffs):
Bep Guidolin, Boston Bruins (youngest rookie in NHL history)
Glen Harmon, Montreal Canadiens
Ted Kennedy, Toronto Maple Leafs
Joe Klukay*, Toronto Maple Leafs
Bobby Lee, Montreal Canadiens
Bud Poile, Toronto Maple Leafs
Bill Quackenbush, Detroit Red Wings
Maurice Richard, Montreal Canadiens

Last games
The following is a list of players of note that played their last game in the NHL in 1942–43 (listed with their last team):
Ebbie Goodfellow, Detroit Red Wings
Gordie Drillon, Montreal Canadiens

See also
1942-43 NHL transactions
List of Stanley Cup champions
1942 in sports
1943 in sports

References
 
 
 
 
 
 

Notes

External links
Hockey Database
NHL.com

 
1
1